Conor Angus Cloud Hickey (born July 10, 1998) is an American actor best known for his portrayal of Fezco in the HBO television series Euphoria.

Life and career
Cloud was born in Oakland, California, although much of his family resides in Ireland. Cloud is the eldest of his siblings, and has younger twin sisters. He attended the School of Production Design at Oakland School for the Arts, where he was a classmate of his Euphoria co-star Zendaya. While working at Woodland restaurant close to Barclays Center in Brooklyn, New York, he was scouted by Euphoria casting director Jennifer Venditti who he initially thought was trying to scam him before obtaining the role of Fezco on the show. Cloud also premiered in the skate movie, North Hollywood as the character Walker.

Filmography

References

1998 births
Living people
American male film actors
21st-century American male actors
American people of Irish descent
American male television actors
Male actors from California
Actors from California